Pelsin is a village and a former municipality in the Vorpommern-Greifswald district, in Mecklenburg-Vorpommern, Germany. Since 1 January 2010, it is part of the town Anklam.

Villages in Mecklenburg-Western Pomerania
Anklam